Eric Pascoe (born 8 October 1953) is a former Australian rules footballer who played with Carlton in the Victorian Football League (VFL) during the 1970s.

The ruckman from Bendigo was an understudy to John Nicholls and Peter Jones at Carlton and made his early VFL appearances when one of them was injured. He was Carlton's reserves 'Best and Fairest' winner in 1973. Nicholls retired in 1974 but by then ruckman Mike Fitzpatrick had been recruited from the West Australian Football League and Pascoe continued to play most of his football in the reserves.

After getting a clearance, Pascoe joined Clarence in Tasmania for a two-year stint as captain-coach. He won a Michelsen Medal in 1979, while playing for Bendigo Football League club Golden Square.

References

1953 births
Carlton Football Club players
Clarence Football Club players
Clarence Football Club coaches
Golden Square Football Club players
Australian rules footballers from Victoria (Australia)
Living people